The 1897 North Carolina Tar Heels football team represented the University of North Carolina in the 1897 college football season.  They played ten games with a final record of 7–3. The team captain for the 1897 season was Arthur Belden.

Schedule

References

North Carolina
North Carolina Tar Heels football seasons
North Carolina Tar Heels football